The Martinsville Novelty Corporation Factory is a historic factory complex located at Martinsville, Virginia. The main factory was built in 1929, and is a long, three-story, brick building that was constructed for the purpose of manufacturing small pieces of furniture called "novelty" pieces in the furniture trade.  Associated with the main factory are the contributing wood storage area and the kilns where the wood was dried; a long, metal Quonset hut; a railroad spur and trestle; a long concrete-block and frame storage building; and a small, rectangular, brick building that at one time housed a restaurant that served the employees of Martinsville Novelty and W. M. Bassett Furniture factory.  The Martinsville Novelty Corporation was the last significant furniture concern established in Martinsville before the Great Depression. The factory closed in 1995.

It was listed on the National Register of Historic Places in 2010.

References

Defunct furniture manufacturers
Industrial buildings and structures on the National Register of Historic Places in Virginia
Industrial buildings completed in 1929
Buildings and structures in Martinsville, Virginia
National Register of Historic Places in Martinsville, Virginia
Furniture companies of the United States
Defunct manufacturing companies based in Virginia